Ponerini is a tribe of Ponerinae ants with 46 genera and 6 extinct genera.

Genera

Anochetus 
†Archiponera 
Asphinctopone 
Austroponera 
Belonopelta 
Boloponera 
Bothroponera 
Brachyponera 
Buniapone 
Centromyrmex 
†Cephalopone 
Cryptopone 
†Cyrtopone 
Diacamma 
Dinoponera 
Dolioponera 
Ectomomyrmex 
Emeryopone 
Euponera 
Feroponera 
Fisheropone 
Hagensia 
Harpegnathos 
Hypoponera 
Iroponera 
Leptogenys 
Loboponera 
Mayaponera 
Megaponera 
Mesoponera 
†Messelepone 
Myopias 
Neoponera 
Odontomachus 
Odontoponera 
Ophthalmopone 
Pachycondyla 
Paltothyreus 
Parvaponera 
Phrynoponera 
Plectroctena 
Ponera 
†Ponerites 
Promyopias 
†Protopone 
Psalidomyrmex 
Pseudoneoponera 
Pseudoponera 
Rasopone 
Simopelta 
Streblognathus 
Thaumatomyrmex

References

Ponerinae
Ant tribes